Watch Horror Films, Keep America Strong! is a 2008 documentary about the popular television series Creature Features, which was produced in Oakland, California from 1971 to 1984.

Produced by independent filmmakers Tom Wyrsch and Robert Napton, the film features interviews with Creature Feature hosts Bob Wilkins and John Stanley, classic clips, as well as interviews with other key figures close to the show. The film premiered in May, 2008 at the Grand Lake Theater in Oakland, California.

References

External links
 Official website
 

American documentary films
Documentary films about television
Documentary films about horror
Films shot in California
Culture of Oakland, California
2000s English-language films
2000s American films